The Tocharian script, also known as Central Asian slanting Gupta script or North Turkestan Brāhmī,  is an abugida which uses a system of diacritical marks to associate vowels with consonant symbols. Part of the Brahmic scripts, it is a version of the Indian Brahmi script. It is used to write the Central Asian Indo-European Tocharian languages, mostly from the 8th century (with a few earlier ones, probably as early as 300 CE) that were written on palm leaves, wooden tablets and Chinese paper, preserved by the extremely dry climate of the Tarim Basin. Samples of the language have been discovered at sites in Kucha and Karasahr, including many mural inscriptions. Mistakenly identifying the speakers of this language with the Tokharoi people of Tokharistan (the Bactria of the Greeks), early authors called these languages "Tocharian". This naming has remained, although the names Agnean and Kuchean have been proposed as a replacement.

Tocharian A and B are not mutually intelligible. Properly speaking, based on the tentative interpretation of twqry as related to Tokharoi, only Tocharian A may be referred to as Tocharian, while Tocharian B could be called Kuchean (its native name may have been kuśiññe), but since their grammars are usually treated together in scholarly works, the terms A and B have proven useful. A common Proto-Tocharian language must precede the attested languages by several centuries, probably dating to the 1st millennium BC. Given the small geographical range of and the lack of secular texts in Tocharian A, it might alternatively have been a liturgical language, the relationship between the two being similar to that between Classical Chinese and Mandarin. However, the lack of a secular corpus in Tocharian A is by no means definite, due to the fragmentary preservation of Tocharian texts in general.

The alphabet the Tocharians were using is derived from the Brahmi alphabetic syllabary (abugida) and is referred to as slanting Brahmi. It soon became apparent that a large proportion of the manuscripts were translations of known Buddhist works in Sanskrit and some of them were even bilingual, facilitating decipherment of the new language. Besides the Buddhist and Manichaean religious texts, there were also monastery correspondence and accounts, commercial documents, caravan permits, and medical and magical texts, and one love poem. Many Tocharians embraced Manichaean duality or Buddhism.

In 1998, Chinese linguist Ji Xianlin published a translation and analysis of fragments of a Tocharian Maitreyasamiti-Nataka discovered in 1974 in Yanqi.

The Tocharian script probably died out after 840, when the Uyghurs were expelled from Mongolia by the Kyrgyz, retreating to the Tarim Basin. This theory is supported by the discovery of translations of Tocharian texts into Uyghur. During Uyghur rule, the peoples assimilated by the Turkic speaking Uyghurs now in Xinjiang.

Script

The Tocharian script is based on Brahmi, with each consonant having an inherent vowel, which can be altered by adding a vowel mark or removed by a special nullifying mark, the virama. Unlike other Brahmi scripts, Tocharian has a second set of characters called Fremdzeichen that double up several of the standard consonants, but with an inherent "Ä" vowel. The eleven Fremdzeichen are most often found as substitutes for the standard consonant+virama in conjuncts, but they can be found in any context other than with the explicit "Ä" vowel mark. Fremdzeichen as consonant+virama is not found in later Tocharian texts.

Table of Tocharian letters

Evolution from Brahmi to Tocharian

Manuscripts in Sanskrit, using Middle Brahmi script and the Kushan period, and carbon dated to the 2nd century CE, have been discovered in the Tarim Basin, and particularly at Kizil. Some of the fragments, quite possibly the oldest Sanskrit manuscript of any type related to Buddhism and Hinduism discovered so far, were discovered in 1906 in the form of a pile of more than 1,000 palm leaf fragments in the Ming-oi, Kizil Caves, during the third Turfan expedition headed by Albert Grünwedel. The calibrated age of the manuscript by Carbon-14 technique is 130 CE (80–230 CE), corresponding to the rule of the Kushan king Kanishka. 

The Tocharian script evolved from the Middle Brahmi script of the Kushan Empire:

References

External links
 TITUS: Tocharian alphabets, conjugation tables, and  manuscripts from the Berlin Turfan Collection
 A Tocharian-to-English dictionary with nearly 200 words with accompanying article
 Tocharian Online by Todd B. Krause and Jonathan Slocum, University of Texas at Austin
Tocharian alphabet at Omniglot.com
 Online: , also in print: 

Tocharian languages
Tocharians
Obsolete writing systems  
Writing systems